Omar López (born June 27, 1989 in Tepic, Nayarit) is a Mexican professional footballer who currently plays for Achuapa and previously played for Coras de Nayarit F.C. Cimarrones de Sonora  Ballenas Galeana Morelos  Delfines de Los Cabos F.C.  of Ascenso MX on loan from Cruz Azul. In Guatemala he played for Marquense, Aurora, and Sacachispas.

References

Liga MX players
Living people
1989 births
Mexican footballers
People from Tepic
Association footballers not categorized by position